Staunton is an unincorporated community in Fayette County, in the U.S. state of Ohio.

History
Staunton was platted in 1848. The community was named after Staunton, Virginia, the native home of a share of the first settlers. A post office was established at Staunton in 1844, and remained in operation until 1903.

References

Unincorporated communities in Fayette County, Ohio
Unincorporated communities in Ohio